Vertes, Vértes or Vertès may refer to:

Eva Vertes (born 1985), American cancer researcher
Marcel Vertès (1895–1961), Hungarian costume designer
Vértes Hills, mountain range in Hungary
Battle of Vértes, 1051
Les Négresses Vertes, French musical group